The Great Sandy-Tanami desert is a ecoregion of Western Australia extending into the Northern Territory.
It is designated as a World Wildlife Fund region.

Location and description
This very large ecoregion consists of the Little Sandy Desert, Great Sandy Desert, Tanami, and Davenport Murchison Ranges Interim Biogeographic Regionalisation for Australia (IBRA) regions. The landscape is desert sands with areas of wooded steppe and shrubby grassland. The Great Sandy Desert is a large area of red desert sand dunes, while the Tanami Desert to the east is flat sand broken up with areas of hills. One prominent landmark in the region is the large sandstone rock Uluru. The climate is hot and dry and the area is mostly uninhabited.

Flora
The vegetation is very thin and consists of spinifex grass and saltbush shrubs that are adapted to the desert conditions. There are also occasional acacias and desert oaks.

Fauna
Much of the wildlife of this hot climate is nocturnal including the rabbit-sized marsupial the Bilby and the Rufous hare-wallabies of the Tanami Desert. The wildlife of these deserts includes communities of wild camels, descendants of animals brought here as transport in earlier times.

Protected areas
Protected areas in the ecoregion include Iytwelepenty / Davenport Range National Park, Karlamilyi National Park, and Uluṟu-Kata Tjuṯa National Park.

External links

References

Further reading
 Thackway, R and I D Cresswell (1995) An interim biogeographic regionalisation for Australia : a framework for setting priorities in the National Reserves System Cooperative Program Version 4.0 Canberra : Australian Nature Conservation Agency, Reserve Systems Unit, 1995. 

Deserts of Western Australia

Deserts of the Northern Territory
Deserts and xeric shrublands
Ecoregions of Western Australia

Ecoregions of the Northern Territory
Pilbara